Nokia 6220 classic is a Symbian OS smartphone announced by Nokia on 11 February 2008. It is notable for featuring a Xenon flash for its 5-megapixel camera, similar to Nokia N82 and often considered as a "budget" version of the N82. Despite its compact size, it offers features comparable to the Nseries lineup, though it lacks Wi-Fi and a 3.5 mm audio jack, probably to cut design and production costs.

Features

 HSDPA-3.6M/10.2M/ WCDMA-900/2100 / DTM EGPRS-850/900/1800/1900 Class 11A/32B 
 GPS navigation with Assisted GPS
 Symbian OS 9.3 with the S60 interface 3rd Edition.
 Secondary frontal camera for video phone calls (CIF+ resolution).
 2.5 mm headjack for supplied headset.
 Micro USB connector.
 Bluetooth version 2.0 with A2DP profile.
 MicroSD SDHC card slot.
 Stereo FM radio with support for Visual Radio and RDS.
 Audio player supporting MP3, M4A, eAAC+, RealAudio 7,8,10, and WMA formats.
 5.0-megapixel camera with autofocus, Carl Zeiss lens and Xenon flash.
 Video recording-VGA 640×480 @ 30 fps.
 H.264/MPEG-4 AVC, H.263, RealVideo 7,8,9/10 support.
 Java MIDP 2.1

See also
Nokia SU-33W

Notes

External links

 Nokia Device Details 
 Video review of Nokia 6220 Classic 

6220 classic
Mobile phones with user-replaceable battery